Lai Lok Yin (born 20 July 1995 in Hong Kong) is a former Hong Kong professional footballer who played as a winger.

Club career
In 2015, Lai joined Dreams Metro Gallery.

On 5 December 2015, Lai scored his first goal for Metro Gallery against Wong Tai Sin in a 2–0 victory.

Following the announcement of Metro Gallery's hiatus, Lai became a free agent. He joined Pegasus at the conclusion of his contract on 30 June 2016. On 11 June 2017, HK Pegasus chairperson Canny Leung revealed that Lai would be leaving the club.

He was not out of work for long as two weeks later, Lai signed with Rangers.

References

External links
 Lai Lok Yin at HKFA
 

1995 births
Living people
Hong Kong footballers
Hong Kong Premier League players
Hong Kong First Division League players
Metro Gallery FC players
TSW Pegasus FC players
Hong Kong Rangers FC players
Association football wingers